P. moritziana may refer to:

 Pitcairnia moritziana, a plant endemic to Venezuela
 Platystachys moritziana, an air plant
 Polysiphonia moritziana, a red algae